Cato van Ee is a Dutch-American fashion model.

Early life 
Van Ee was born in South Carolina, United States, to Dutch parents and raised in California, United States until she was 8 years old, when the family moved to Bentveld, The Netherlands.

Career 
Van Ee entered the Dutch Elite Model Look contest in 2004 and signed with Elite Model Management the same year. Her first magazine cover was in January 2006 for Elle Netherlands, and she appeared in the magazine throughout the year. She made her runway debut as a Prada (and Miu Miu) exclusive in 2008. She moved to New York City for her career, and switched to IMG Models. Soon after, she was photographed by Steven Meisel for a Calvin Klein Jeans ad campaign. In 2009, she was also chosen as an exclusive for Givenchy and participated in Vogue'''s Fashion's Night Out event. She appeared in an ensemble D&G campaign with models such as Jacquelyn Jablonski and Daria Strokous.

In June 2020, she, Julie Hoomans, and various other models such as Bente Oort and Anna de Rijk appeared on individual covers of Vogue Netherlands during the COVID-19 health crisis; the covers had been shot remotely.

 Personal life 
Van Ee has a daughter, Eleanor Maeve, born in December 2021. After years of delays due to the COVID-19 pandemic, she married her life partner in 2022. She and her daughter have appeared on the cover of Elle'' Spain.

References 

Living people
1990 births
Dutch female models
American female models
American people of Dutch descent
People from Zandvoort
People from North Holland
IMG Models models
Prada exclusive models
People from Amsterdam
People from South Carolina
Female models from California
Models from New York City